The Alexander and Nellie P. Cordner House is a historic Victorian Eclectic house located at 415 S. 400 E. in Orem, Utah.  Built in 1909, the -story brick house has projecting bays and an asymmetrical facade.  It was listed on the National Register of Historic Places in 1998.

See also
 Cordner–Calder House, also in Orem and NRHP-listed
 William James and Edna Cordner House, also in Orem and NRHP-listed
 National Register of Historic Places listings in Utah County, Utah

References

Houses completed in 1909
Houses on the National Register of Historic Places in Utah
Houses in Orem, Utah
Victorian architecture in Utah
National Register of Historic Places in Orem, Utah